In Slaughter Natives is an industrial and dark ambient project created in 1985 by Swedish musician Jouni Havukainen.

Discography

Albums 
In Slaughter Natives (1988)
 Enter Now the World (1992)
 Sacrosancts Bleed (1992)
 Mort aux Vaches (1994) - with Deutsch Nepal
 Purgate My Stain (1996)
 Resurrection (2004)
 Cannula Coma Legio (2014)
Psicofonias - Las Voces Desconocidas (2016)

Members 

 Jouni Havukainen (1985-present)

External links 

In Slaughter Natives at Bandcamp
In Slaughter Natives at Facebook

See also 

 List of dark ambient artists
 List of ambient music artists

References 

Industrial musicians
Swedish musicians
Dark ambient musicians
1985 establishments in Sweden
Soleilmoon artists